National Express may refer to:

National Express, transport company listed on the London stock exchange
National Express Coaches, long-distance coach operator in the United Kingdom
National Express Coventry, bus operator in the West Midlands
National Express East Anglia, train operating company that operated the Greater Anglia franchise between April 2004 and February 2012
National Express East Coast, train operating company that operated the InterCity East Coast franchise between December 2007 and November 2009
National Express Germany, train operator in Germany
National Express Midland Metro, tram operator in the West Midlands
National Express West Midlands, bus operator in the West Midlands
National Express (song), a song by The Divine Comedy